Stephen Douglas Rosenthal (born October 24, 1949) is an American attorney who served as the 37th Attorney General of Virginia. Elected by the Virginia General Assembly to fill the vacancy of Mary Sue Terry, he remained in office until the election of Jim Gilmore.

References

1949 births
Living people
Virginia Attorneys General
Virginia Democrats
Politicians from Richmond, Virginia
Lawyers from Richmond, Virginia
Washington and Lee University alumni